Belgian Bowling may refer to one of these games of Belgian origin which are also played in parts of North America:

 Feather Bowling or trabollen, in which the court is a curved trough
 Rolle Bolle or krulbollen, in which the court is flat

Bowling